Chrozophoreae is a tribe of plant of the family Euphorbiaceae.

Subtribes and genera
The U.S. National Plant Germplasm System lists four subtribes:

Chrozophorinae
Chrozophora A. Juss. - type genus

Ditaxinae
Argythamnia
Caperonia
Chiropetalum
Ditaxis
Philyra

Doryxylinae
Doryxylon
Melanolepis
Sumbaviopsis
Thyrsanthera

Speranskiinae
Speranskia (Bunge) Baill.

See also
 Taxonomy of the Euphorbiaceae

References

 
Euphorbiaceae tribes